The  was a magistracy of the Republic of Venice responsible for the oversight of trade and manufacturing.

History
The magistracy was established for the first time, as an interim measure, in 1506, but was made permanent in 1517.

The magistracy's authority was soon extended to cover wages (1540), the Levantine Jews of the Ghetto of Venice (1541), jurisdiction over the Fondaco dei Tedeschi (1550) and approval of the resolutions of lay associations (1553), the supervision of the  funds (1570), and of navigation and maritime insurance (1588). Further extensions followed with jurisdiction over Ottoman Jews (1625) and Armenians (1676), combating smuggling (1682)—a special province of a member of the Five known as the —and finally on the sale of tobacco (1723).

References

Sources
 
 

1506 establishments
Government of the Republic of Venice
1500s establishments in Italy
16th-century establishments in the Republic of Venice
Economy of the Republic of Venice
Trade